Allegany Ballistics Laboratory (ABL) located in Rocket Center, West Virginia, is a diverse industrial complex employing some 1,000 people across .  The facility is a member of the Federal Laboratory Consortium and is operated by Northrop Grumman (former Alliant Techsystems) under contract with the Naval Sea Systems Command (NAVSEA).

Current operation 

The ABL facility is a manufacturer of advanced composite structures for the F-22 Raptor and other aerospace projects. ATK also operates 6 of 11 known advanced fiber placement machines. In addition the site produces about 80 military products, including: 30mm shells for Apache helicopters, training grenades, fuze-proximity sensors, mortars and warheads, and tank ammunition.

Also on the site is the Robert C. Byrd Hilltop Office Complex and the Robert C. Byrd Institute for Advanced Flexible Manufacturing.  At the Robert C. Byrd Complex on the hill companies have rented space to do secure research, among them IBM (which recently acquired National Interest Security Company) who is digitizing data on hurricane cleanup, avian influenza, and weather records.

It also plays a significant role in continuity of government operations.

History 

ABL was established in 1944 on the site of a former ammunitions plant on land owned by the Army. After World War II, the plant was transferred to the Office of Scientific Research and Development and was involved in building propulsion devices and engines for the solid-rocket industry.

Later in the decade, ownership of ABL was transferred to the Navy office of Naval Sea Systems Command. Since 1946 it was operated by the Hercules Powder Company. In 1956 when it was producing Altair rocket stages for Vanguard rockets, ABL was, "A subsidiary of the Navy operated by the Hercules Powder Company." The Navy now contracts out operation of the facility to ATK (Alliant Techsystems), a $3.4 billion corporation based in Edina, Minnesota.

In 1998, ATK's Conventional Munitions Group was selected by Lockheed Martin Aeronautical Systems to produce the fiber-placed composite pivot shaft assembly for the F-22 Raptor air-dominance fighter.  Work on the production program was performed at Alliant's automated fiber placement production facility at the Allegany Ballistics Laboratory before the production of F-22 aircraft ended in 2012.  The fiber placement facility was constructed as part of a $177 million renovation and restoration program funded by the U.S. Naval Sea Systems Command (NAVSEA), which owns the Allegany Ballistics Laboratory.

Local Perception 

As for the ecological impact, it is believed the facility contributes greatly to the pollution of the adjacent North Branch Potomac River. While this is unsupported, the company does have numerous runoff sites. Also, the groundwater in the surrounding community has been verified to contain many contaminants, although actions have since been taken to reduce these contaminants, and are part of a constant monitoring process.

Companies
The following privately owned ventures are located on the ABL site:

See also 

 Barton Business Park
 North Branch Industrial Complex 
 Upper Potomac Industrial Park

References

External links 
 ATK: Alliant Techsystems
 Robert C. Byrd Institute
 FLC: Federal Laboratory Consortium
 FLC: Federal Laboratory Consortium: Mid-Atlantic
 National Interest Security Company

Ballistics
Science parks in the United States
Business parks of the United States
Buildings and structures in Mineral County, West Virginia
Military installations in West Virginia
Military Superfund sites
Superfund sites in West Virginia
Continuity of government in the United States